40 / 42/50 are three local bus lines in Kristiansand, Norway to Søgne. They all go from downtown Kristiansand to the centrum of Søgne and further in the municipality. 40 and 42 goes all day and evening, while line 50 only goes in the rush hours. Line 40 goes ten past the hour and line 42 ten past half. There are extra buses in the rush hours.

Description

40
40 goes from downtown Kristiansand, over Hannevika and follows E39 to Tangvall in Søgne. It then continues from Tangvall to the neighborhoods and the shore Høllen - Årosskogen.

42
42 goes from downtown Kristiansand, over Hannevika and follows E39 to Tangvall in Søgne. It then continues to the neighborhood Langenes.

47
47 is a local bus line in Søgne, collaborating with line 40 and 42. 47 goes to the neighborhoods Eik, Lunde, Vedderheia, Lohne and Trysnes from Tangvall.

48
48 is a local bus line in Søgne served by a mini bus from Tangvall to Ålo.

50
50 goes from downtown Kristiansand to Vågsbygd and follows line Norwegian County Road 456 all the way to Søgne, past Voiebyen in Kristiansand to Langenes in Søgne, then past Søgne High School and ends in Tangvall.

Night lines
In the weekend, the buses goes also during the night which serves the city around 2-3 times from 1 AM to 3 AM. Bus card is not available for use on these lines and it cost extra night fee.

N40
The night line N40 and goes from Kristiansand to Tangvall - Lunde - Høllen - Årosskogen.

Rush hour
In the rush hour, line 40 and 42 goes twice as much and continues from downtown Kristiansand to UiA.

Roads 

The lines uses some notable roads in Kristiansand. The following are:

References

Transport in Kristiansand
Bus routes in Norway